K-1 World MAX 2009 World Championship Tournament - Final - was a martial arts event promoted by the K-1 organization. It took place on Monday, October 26, 2009 at the Yokohama Arena in Yokohama, Japan. It was the 8th annual K-1 World Max (70 kg/154 lbs weight class) World Championship Final, featuring four quarter final winners of K-1 World MAX 2009 Final 8 held on July 13, 2009 in Tokyo, Japan. It was broadcast in North America on October 31 by HDNet.

K-1 MAX World Grand Prix 2009 Final bracket

Results

See also
List of K-1 events
List of K-1 champions
List of male kickboxers

References

External links
K-1 Official Website

K-1 MAX events
2009 in kickboxing
Kickboxing in Japan
Sport in Yokohama